Robert Šebenik (born 3 September 1965) is a Yugoslav former cyclist. He competed in the team time trial at the 1988 Summer Olympics.

References

External links
 

1965 births
Living people
Yugoslav male cyclists
Slovenian male cyclists
Olympic cyclists of Yugoslavia
Cyclists at the 1988 Summer Olympics
Sportspeople from Ljubljana